The PTT Archive (formerly Historical Archive and Library PTT) is the archive of the former Swiss Postal, Telegraph and Telephone Services (PTT). In 1997 the PTT was divided up into the companies of the Swiss Post (today the Swiss Post Ltd.) and the Swisscom Ltd. On behalf of these two public limited companies, the PTT Archive is being operated by the Swiss Foundation for the History of the Post and Telecommunications. By obligation of Swiss archival law, the Swiss Post Ltd. and the Swisscom Ltd., being the successors of the PTT, are bound to preserve these archival holdings and make them accessible to the public. The PTT Archive is situated in Köniz near Bern and is classified as an object of national interest in the Swiss Inventory of Cultural Assets.

History and Mandate 
On April 30, 1893 the Directorate General of Posts in Bern issued an “Instruktion betreffend die Ordnung des Archivs, die Anlage und Führung der Centralbibliothek und die Besorgung der Registratur der Expeditionskanzlei der Oberpostdirektion“ [Instruction concerning the organization of the archive, the creation and the management of a central library and the provision of the filing cabinet of the Directorate General of Posts]. This is the earliest known historical source that is concerned with the creation of an archive and a library for the then still autonomous directorate General of Posts. Over the time span of a hundred years, this first archive and the library evolved into a central information office of the PTT, called „Bibliothek – Information – Dokumentation“ [Library – Information – Documentation] (BID). At times, the BID employed up to 30 employees. In its present form and with its current mandate, the PTT Archive came into existence only after the liberalization of the PTT. On December 31, 1997 the Swiss Post and the Swisscom Ltd. transferred the former corporate archive as well as the library of the PTT to the specially founded Swiss Foundation for the History of the Post and Telecommunications. The two founders came to an agreement that the two components of the holdings were to be stored at the same location. The archive and the library were henceforth constituting the “Historische Archive und Bibliothek PTT” [Historical Archive and Library PTT] at Viktoriastrasse 21 in Bern. In 2013 the archive moved into its current premises at the Sägestrasse 77 in Köniz.

The holdings of the PTT Archive are subject to the Bundesgesetz über die Archivierung [Federal Law of Archiving] (BGA) and are property of the Swiss Confederation. Therefore, the holdings are subject to obliging terms of protection: 30 years for fact files and 50 years for personal files. Request for inspection for files that fall under the terms of protection can be directed to the PTT Archive.

According to the agreement between the Swiss Federal Archives and the Swiss Foundation for the History of the Post and Telecommunications, reached in 1998, the foundation is commissioned to manage the corporate archive of the former PTT, to develop the holdings appropriately and to make them available to the public. This means that the archived documents can neither be transferred nor removed without the explicit consent of the federal archives. Since the year 2018 the Historical Archive and Library PTT is known in an abbreviated form as PTT Archive.

Holdings 
The main holdings of the PTT Archive consist of the PTT's documents of the years 1848 to 1997, which are subject to the Bundesgesetz über die Archivierung [Federal Law of Archiving] (BGA). The holdings comprise documents from all over Switzerland, from Geneva to St. Gallen. They are therefore trilingual (German, French, Italian). Documents from preceding institutions of the federal postal services can be found in the archive as well.

The holdings encompass documents concerning the organization and the management of the Directorate General of Posts, the District Postal Services as well as the individual post offices. Furthermore, there are documents concerning various routes of the postbus, transport and correspondence statistics, records concerning the development of the telephone-network and the telegraph-network in Switzerland, the introduction of the so-called NATEL (Nationales Autotelefon), the internet and the telefax, documents concerning the PTT's research and development department, and not the least employee records.

Furthermore, there are many documentation folders concerning specific technical or organizational subjects, which were put together by the former BID department.

The holdings compass also several hundred linear meters of grey literature, from workplace regulations and forms all the way to telephone books. The PTT-Archive holds the only complete collection of Swiss telephone books, dating back to the very first exemplar of 1880. The PTT's former academic library with a focus on the history of postal services and telecommunication is also part of the holdings. Not the least there are publications concerning the UPU (Universal Postal Union) and the ITU (International Telecommunication Union). Both international organizations were founded in Bern.

Thanks to the witness interviews of the PTT Archive's oral history project, there are also video sources available.

Services of the PTT-Archive 
First and foremost, the PTT-Archive is responsible to secure public access to the holdings and to index them in an online database. The documents can be studied in the study room of the archive. Every year multiple visitors are being given a tour through the depot. At this occasion the visitors are given an impression of the work at the PTT.

The archive takes an important intermediary function with the constant extension of its oral history project. With the interviews of former employees, the PTT-Archive can establish a reference with today's Swiss Post Ltd. and the Swisscom Ltd. Depending on its resources, the PTT Archive realized up to 14 interviews each year, ever since 2014.

The PTT Archive is regularly involved in university courses and organizes Wikipedia-Workshops on various historical aspects of the PTT.

The archive hosted intergenerational workshops for apprentices of the Swiss Post Ltd. on multiple occasions. In these workshops the apprentices engage with historical sources, in order to discuss their current work routine with former employees of the PTT.

References

External links 

 Website PTT Archive
 Database of the archive 
 Wir, die PTT. Oral History Website (German/French)

Archives in Switzerland